In algebraic geometry, a Fourier–Mukai transform ΦK  is a functor between derived categories of coherent sheaves D(X) → D(Y) for schemes X and Y, which is, in a sense, an integral transform along a kernel object K ∈ D(X×Y). Most natural functors, including basic ones like pushforwards and pullbacks, are of this type.

That equivalence is analogous to the classical Fourier transform that gives an isomorphism between tempered distributions on a finite-dimensional real vector space and its dual.

Definition

Let X and Y be smooth projective varieties, K ∈ Db(X×Y) an object in the derived category of coherent sheaves on their product. Denote by q the projection X×Y→X, by p the projection X×Y→Y. Then the Fourier-Mukai transform ΦK is a functor Db(X)→Db(Y) given by

Fourier-Mukai transforms always have left and right adjoints, both of which are also kernel transformations. Given two kernels K1 ∈ Db(X×Y) and K2 ∈ Db(Y×Z), the composed functor ΦK2 ∘ ΦK1 is also a Fourier-Mukai transform.

The structure sheaf of the diagonal , taken as a kernel, produces the identity functor on Db(X). For a morphism f:X→Y, the structure sheaf of the graph Γf produces a pushforward when viewed as an object in Db(X×Y), or a pullback when viewed as an object in Db(Y×X).

On abelian varieties
Let  be an abelian variety and  be its dual variety. Let  and  be the canonical projections.
The corresponding Fourier–Mukai functor with kernel  is then

There is a similar functor

If the canonical class of a variety is ample or anti-ample, then the derived category of coherent sheaves determines the variety. In general, an abelian variety is not isomorphic to its dual, so this Fourier–Mukai transform gives examples of different varieties (with trivial canonical bundles) that have equivalent derived categories. 

Let g denote the dimension of X. The Fourier–Mukai transformation is nearly involutive :

It interchanges Pontrjagin product and tensor product.

 have used the Fourier-Mukai transform to prove the Künneth decomposition for the Chow motives of abelian varieties.

Applications in string theory

In string theory, T-duality (short for target space duality), which relates two quantum field theories or string theories with different spacetime geometries, is closely related with the Fourier-Mukai transformation.

See also 

 Derived noncommutative algebraic geometry

References

 

Abelian varieties